Riverview is a community in the city of St. Catharines, Ontario, Canada. It borders Regional Road 89 to the north, Lockhart Road to the south, Marsdale Drive to the east, and the Twelve Mile Creek to the west.

Glenridge is to the north, Brockview, Power Glen is to the south, Marsdale is to the east, and the Twelve Mile Creek, Power Glen is to the west.

Neighbourhoods in St. Catharines